One Foot in Front of the Other is the debut mixtape by British singer and songwriter Griff. It was released on 18 June 2021 by label Warner Records. It follows Griff's debut extended play The Mirror Talk (2019). The mixtape's lead single, "Black Hole", was released on 18 January 2021; she performed the song in May 2021 at the 2021 Brit Awards where she was awarded the Brit Award for Rising Star. The single was followed by the release of the title track and "Shade of Yellow". Originally set to be released on 11 June, the release was pushed back by one week.

Track listing

Charts

References 

2021 mixtape albums
Warner Records albums